Phryneta pallida is a species of beetle in the family Cerambycidae. It was described by James Thomson in 1857. It is known from South Africa.

References

Phrynetini
Beetles described in 1857